The Queensland Cyclones are an Australian broomball team, representing the state of Queensland at the Australian National Broomball Championships.

Players representing the Queensland Cyclones are primarily drawn from the North Queensland Broomball Association, a broomball club based in the north Queensland city of Townsville.

The Cyclones have a comparatively poor record at the National Championships when compared to the representative teams from elsewhere in Australia.  Their only national title to date is the 1995 Mixed Elite title.  They have finished as runners up in most divisions on a number of occasions.

List of achievements at National Championships

Men's Elite Division 
 Runner Up five times (1996, 1997, 1998, 2000, 2005)

Women's Elite Division 
 Runner Up three times (1999 with New South Wales, 2005, 2006)

Mixed Elite Division 
 Champions once (1995)
 Runner Up four times (1996, 1997, 2003, 2005)

Mixed Intermediate Division 
 Runner Up once (2006)

See also 
 Australian National Broomball Championships

References

External links 
 History of Queensland Cyclones, from the official NQBA website (accessed 3 January 2007)

Broomball in Australia
Cy